Melber (also known as Burg and Lewisburg) is an unincorporated community in Graves and McCracken counties in the U.S. state of Kentucky.

Andy Melber, an early postmaster, gave the community his last name.

Zip Code
Melber's zip code, 42069, has been the subject of internet memes due to the numbers 420 and 69 appearing in succession of one another, conveying both 420's significance in cannabis culture, and 69 as a sexual position.

Notable people
 Ray Smith, rockabilly musician
 Andy Melber, early postmaster

References

Unincorporated communities in Graves County, Kentucky
Unincorporated communities in McCracken County, Kentucky
Unincorporated communities in Kentucky